The Michigan Department of History, Arts and Libraries (MHAL) was an agency of the U.S. state of Michigan.  Its official name was Michigan History, Arts and Libraries.  It was created in 2001 and was eliminated in 2009.

History and responsibilities
The Michigan Department of History, Arts and Libraries was a portmanteau agency created by executive reorganization in October 2001 during the administration of Governor John Engler.  The specific functions of the Department dated back to the publication startup of the Michigan Pioneer and Historical Collections in 1874, followed by the creation of the Mackinac Island State Park Commission in 1895.  The agency included the Library of Michigan, the Mackinac State Historic Parks, the Michigan Council for Arts and Cultural Affairs, and the Michigan Historical Center.

The Department operated several of Michigan's resources for learning and tourism, including Fort Mackinac, Fort Michilimackinac, the Library of Michigan, Michigan Historical Center, and the Thunder Bay National Marine Sanctuary.  It also published Michigan History magazine.

The Department was eliminated by executive reorganization in July 2009 by the administration of Governor Jennifer Granholm.

External links
 —Lists departments assuming the functions of the former agency
 Archives of Michigan
 Library of Michigan
 Mackinac State Historic Parks
 Michigan Council for Arts and Cultural Affairs
 Michigan Historical Museum
 State Historic Preservation Office

References

History, Arts and Libraries
History of Michigan
State history organizations of the United States